The 2019 season was Barcelona Sporting Club's 94th season in existence and the club's 61st season in the top flight of Ecuadorian football. Barcelona was involved in three competitions: the main national tournament Liga Pro, the national cup called Copa Ecuador, and the international tournament Copa Libertadores.

In their Copa Libertadores campaign, Barcelona played the second qualifying phase against the Uruguayan Defensor Sporting. Barcelona won the first leg match 2-1 away from home, but Defensor Sporting claim CONMEBOL for an infraction of Barcelona. CONMEBOL awarded Defensor Sporting a 3–0 win as a result of Barcelona fielding an ineligible player. In the second leg match, Barcelona won 1-0 at home but Defensor won 3-1 on aggregate, so Barcelona was eliminated from the tournament.

In their Copa Ecuador campaign Barcelona started playing in the round of 32. Barcelona won 3–1 on aggregate against Mineros SC and advanced to the round of 16. Then Barcelona won the key by the away goals rule (the aggregate score ended up in 2–2) against Santa Rita and advanced to quarterfinals. Barcelona also won in their quarterfinals key against El Nacional by the away goals rule (the aggregate score ended up 1–1) and advanced to semifinals. However, in their semifinals key, Barcelona tied 4-4 on aggregate but lost by the away goals rule against Delfín SC and was eliminated from the tournament.

In their Liga Pro campaign, Barcelona was one of the sixteen fighting for the championship. In the first stage Barcelona won 17 matches, had 4 draws and 9 losses obtaining 55 points at the end of the stage and a +18 of goal difference. Barcelona ended up in the second place of the table, qualifying to 2020 Copa Libertadores first stage and the playoffs. In the quarterfinals Barcelona lost the key against Aucas 0-1 on aggregate and was eliminated from the tournament.

Season overview

February 
On 6 February, Barcelona started their season and their Copa Libertadores campaign defeating Defensor Sporting 1-2 away from home. Ely Esterilla scored the first goal of the 2019 Barcelona season. Álvaro Navarro scored for the Uruguayan club getting a temporary draw, but Barcelona took the lead again by a goal from Xavier Arreaga near the end of the match.

On 9 February, Barcelona started their Liga Pro campaign defeating El Nacional 5–2 at home. Fidel Martínez scored the first goal of the match by penalty kick. Two goals scored by Martínez and another more by Stalin Caicedo made Barcelona taking the lead in the first half. In the second half, El Nacional scored two goals by Jordy Caicedo, but Barcelona expanded their score by two more goals from Ayrton Cisneros y Ángel Quiñónez in the last minutes of the match.

On 11 February, CONMEBOL awarded Defensor Sporting a 3–0 win as a result of Barcelona fielding the ineligible player Sebastián Pérez Cardona in the first leg.

On 12 February, Barcelona defeated Uruguayan Defensor Sporting again 1-0 at home, but due to the CONMEBOL punishment Defensor Sporting won 3–1 on aggregate and advanced to the third stage of the 2019 Copa Libertadores qualifying stages.

In their second Liga Pro match held on 16 February, Barcelona drew 0-0 against Macará.

On 24 February, Barcelona defeated Mushuc Runa 2-0 away from home. Oscar Estupiñan and Ángel Quiñonez scored for Barcelona.

March 
Barcelona lost their two first matches in March: the first one was held on 3 March against Independiente with a 3-0 lost away from home, and the second one was against Universidad Católica with a 2-1 at home held on 10 March.

On 17 March, Barcelona defeated Fuerza Amarilla 0-3 away from home. Barcelona goals were scored by Pedro Pablo Velasco, Fidel Martínez and Christian Alemán.

In the seventh round of the Liga Pro first stage, Barcelona drew 1-1 against Liga de Quito in a match played on 30 March. Barcelona goal was scored by Fidel Martínez in the 25th minute, but in the last minutes of the match Rodrigo Aguirre scored for L.D.U.

April 
Barcelona started April with a draw against América de Quito in a match played on 6 April which ended 2-2 away from home.

Barcelona's biggest win of this season was held on 12 April against Deportivo Cuenca which was defeated 6-2 at home.

On 21 April, Barcelona defeated Delfín 3-1 at home. Barcelona goals were scored by Fidel Martínez, Robert Herrera and Leonardo Campana.

On 24 April, Barcelona started their Copa Ecuador campaign with drew match against Mineros SC with a 1-1 away from home.

Also Aucas was defeated by Barcelona in a match played on 27 April which ended 3-4 away from home.

May 
On 5 May, Barcelona defeated Guayaquil City 1-0 at home. Barcelona's only goal was scored by Leo Campana.

On 12 May, Barcelona defeated their big rival Emelec 0-1 away from home. In the first official Clásico del Astillero of the year, Barcelona's only goal was scored by Fidel Martínez.

On 16 May, Barcelona played the second leg match of the Copa Ecuador Round of 32 against Mineros SC winning with a 2-0. Osbaldo Lastra and Ely Esterilla scored for the Canarios. Barcelona won 3-1 on aggregate and advanced to Round of 16.

June

July

August

September

October

November

Goalscorers

Competitions

Liga Pro

First stage

Standings

Results summary

Results by round

Matches

Playoffs

Quarter-finals 

Aucas won 0–1 on aggregate and advanced to the Semifinals.

Copa FEF Ecuador

Round of 32

Round of 16 

The aggregate score ended up in 2–2, but Barcelona won the key by the away goals rule and advanced to quarterfinals.

Quarter-finals 

The aggregate score ended up in 1–1, but Barcelona won the key by the away goals rule and advanced to semifinals.

Semi-finals 

The aggregate score ended up in 4–4, but Barcelona lost the key by the away goals rule and Delfín advanced to the final.

Copa CONMEBOL Libertadores 

Barcelona joined the competition in the second stage of the 2019 Copa Libertadores qualifying stages.

Second stage 

 The first leg match originally ended 1–2, but CONMEBOL awarded Defensor Sporting a 3–0 win as a result of Barcelona fielding the ineligible player Sebastián Pérez Cardona. 

Defensor Sporting won 3–1 on aggregate and advanced to the third stage of the 2019 Copa Libertadores qualifying stages.

References

External links 

Barcelona S.C. seasons